The  is a Japanese railway line which connects Kanazawa Station in Kanazawa, Ishikawa Prefecture with Uchinada Station in Uchinada, Ishikawa Prefecture. It is owned and operated by Hokuriku Railroad.

Service
All trains make the run from Hokutetsu-Kanazawa to Uchinada once every 30 minutes during the day, and once every 22–24 minutes during peak periods. The trip takes 17 minutes.

Until December 2006, there was an express service which stopped at Kami-Moroe, Waridashi, Mitsuya, and Kagatsuma; the trip took 14 minutes.

History
May 10, 1925: Asanogawa Electric Railway opens Nanatsuya — Shin-Susaki section, electrified at 600 VDC
May 18, 1926: Kanazawa-Ekimae (now Hokutetsu-Kanazawa) — Nanatsuya section opens
July 14, 1929: Shin-Sumachi — Awagasaki-Yūen-Mae (now Uchinada) — Awagasaki-Kaigan section opens
February 11, 1945: Awagasaki-Yūen-Mae — Awagasaki-Kaigan section closes
October 1, 1945: Hokuriku Railway absorbs Asanogawa Electric Railway; line becomes Asanogawa Line
April 21, 1946: Mitsuya Station renamed Tsuribashi Station
1952: Awagasaki-Yūen-Mae — Awagasaki-Kaigan section reopens
July 5, 1956: Hokutetsu-Kanazawa Station moved due to expansion of Kanazawa Station plaza
May 14, 1960: Awagasaki-Yūen-Mae Station moves 0.1 km, renamed to Uchinada Station
June 30, 1961: Shin-Susaki Station closes
April 1, 1972: Freight operations end
July 8, 1974: Uchinada — Awagasaki-Kaigan section closes
November 26, 1974: Tsuribashi Station renamed Mitsuya Station
December 19, 1996: Catenary voltage increased from 600 V to 1500 V DC; Driver-only operation begins
March 28, 2001: Hokutetsu-Kanazawa — Nanatsuya section moved underground; ATS system begins operation
December 1, 2006: Express service abolished

Former connecting lines
 Kanazawa Station: The 5 km 762 mm gauge Jinshi horse-drawn tramway opened in 1898, being converted to 1,067 mm gauge and electrified at 600 V DC in 1914. In 1920, the line was extended to Ono Port, and a further 2 km to Ono Minato in 1923. A 400m branch to Ryokuchi Park opened in 1930, passenger services on the branch ceasing in 1945 though the line remained to service a paper mill. The entire system closed in 1970.

Rolling stock
Hokuriku Railway uses ten 8000 series (formerly Keio 3000 series) railcars on the Asanogawa Line. They are typically run in paired sets.

Former Tokyo Metro 03 series trains entered service on the line on December 21, 2020.

Stations
All stations are located in Ishikawa Prefecture.

See also
 List of railway lines in Japan

References
This article incorporates material from the corresponding article in the Japanese Wikipedia.

 
Rail transport in Ishikawa Prefecture
Railway lines opened in 1925
1067 mm gauge railways in Japan